Robert Noel Tinning (25 December 1925 – 19 May 2001) was an Australian rower who competed in the 1952 Summer Olympics.

Club and state rowing
He was schooled at St Joseph's College, Hunters Hill where he took up rowing. His senior club rowing was done from the Sydney Rowing Club.

Tinning's first state selection for New South Wales came in 1949 in the men's senior eight contesting the King's Cup at the annual Australian Interstate Regatta. Tinning rowed in the bow set of the 1949 New South Wales eight who won the King's Cup. He rowed in further New South Wales King's Cup eights in 1950, 1951 and 1952. Those crews were victorious in 1950 and in 1951 by a blistering four length margin.

International representative rowing
The entire 1949 New South Wales King's Cup crew was selected to represent Australia in competition at the 1950 British Empire Games in Auckland. Tinning was in that crew who won gold medal in the eights competition.

For the 1952 Helsinki Olympics an all New South Wales crew was selected twelve months in advance based on the 1951 King's Cup result. The Olympic selection crew raced  the 1952 King's Cup for New South Wales during its preparation and was comprehensively beaten by Victoria. The media then claimed the Victorian crew should be nominated instead. However the selector Joe Gould stuck with the selected crew since a number of them including stroke Phil Cayzer, had severe adverse reactions to the vaccinations they'd taken for overseas travel. It was also mentioned that their fundraising responsibilities, some 7,000 pounds, impacted their preparation - the Australian Olympic Federation had only been able to fund four air tickets for the eight. Tinning was the bowman of that Australian Olympic men's eight who to their credit won the bronze medal in Helsinki.

An orthopaedic surgeon, Tinning travelled as the official team doctor accompanying the Australian rowing squad who competed at the 1980 Moscow Olympics.

References

External links
 profile

1925 births
2001 deaths
Australian male rowers
Olympic rowers of Australia
Rowers at the 1952 Summer Olympics
Olympic bronze medalists for Australia
Rowers at the 1950 British Empire Games
Commonwealth Games gold medallists for Australia
Olympic medalists in rowing
People educated at St Joseph's College, Hunters Hill
Medalists at the 1952 Summer Olympics
Commonwealth Games medallists in rowing
Medallists at the 1950 British Empire Games